Battlestar Galactica is an American military science fiction television series, and part of the Battlestar Galactica franchise. The show was developed by Ronald D. Moore as a re-imagining of the 1978 Battlestar Galactica television series created by Glen A. Larson. The series first aired as a three-hour miniseries (comprising four broadcast hours) in December 2003 on the Sci-Fi Channel. The television series debuted in the United Kingdom on Sky1 on October 18, 2004, and premiered in the United States on the Sci-Fi Channel on January 14, 2005.

The story arc of Battlestar Galactica is set in a distant star system, where a civilization of humans live on a series of planets known as the Twelve Colonies of Kobol. In the past, the Colonies had been at war with a cybernetic race of their own creation, known as the Cylons. With the self-serving and venal help of a human named Gaius Baltar, the Cylons, some now in human form, launch a sudden sneak attack on the Colonies, laying waste to the planets and devastating their populations. Out of a population numbering in the billions, only approximately 50,000 humans survive, most of whom were aboard civilian  spaceships that avoided destruction. Of all the Colonial Fleet, the eponymous Battlestar Galactica appears to be the only military capital ship that survived the attack. Under the leadership of Colonial Fleet officer Commander William "Bill" Adama and President Laura Roslin, the Galactica and its crew take up the task of leading the small fugitive fleet of survivors into space in search of a fabled refuge known as Earth.

Series overview

Episodes

Miniseries (2003)

Season 1 (2004–05)

Season 2 (2005–06)

Season 3 (2006–07)

Razor (2007)

Season 4 (2008–09)

The Plan (2009)

Webisodes (2006–09)
{{Episode table |background=#303030|title=25 |director=19 |writer=21 |aux1=9 |airdate= 18 |airdateT=Original release|aux1T=Survivorcount |aux3=6 |aux3T= ofInstallments |episodes=

{{Episode list
| RTitle          = The Face of the Enemy
| Aux1            = 
| DirectedBy      = Wayne Rose
| WrittenBy       = Jane Espenson & Seamus Kevin Fahey
| Aux3            = 10
| OriginalAirDate =  – 
| ShortSummary    = Nine days after finding Earth, Lt. Gaeta is onboard a Raptor with several of Galacticas crew and Cylon Eights en route to the Zephyr when a Cylon threat forces the fleet to jump. During the chaos, the Raptor is separated from rest of the fleet and while waiting for a rescue, the passengers and crew mysteriously begin to die off one by one.
| LineColor       = 303030
}}
}}

Home mediaNotes:'''

 In addition to the Blu-ray Disc releases, this set was also released on HD DVD, on December 4, 2007.
 Razor, though being a television movie, is considered to be the first two episodes of season 4, hence the fourth season is technically 22 episodes and runs from 2007 to 2009.
 This set does not contain the second half of Season 4, also known as The Final Season.
 This set does not contain The Plan.
 This set also contains the complete 1978 Battlestar Galactica series, including Galactica 1980.
 This set also contains Battlestar Galactica: Blood & Chrome, the complete Caprica series, the complete 1978 Battlestar Galactica series, the complete Galactica 1980 series, and the 1978 feature film based on the original series pilot episode. This set has been released in European French speaking countries only.

Broadcast ratings

Online availability
Apple iTunes
In January 2006, Apple began offering the episodes for the miniseries, season 1, and season 2 for purchase on the U.S. version of the iTunes Store. In December 2007, the Battlestar Galactica'' episodes were removed from iTunes along with other NBC Universal content. The episodes returned to iTunes when NBC Universal announced their return to iTunes in September 2008. In February 2009, the series became available in high-definition format at the UK iTunes Store.

Other channels
The series has also been available via Amazon Video, Google Play, Hulu, Netflix, PlayStation Network, and Xbox Video. 78 episodes have been made available on the BBC iPlayer as of September 2020.

References

External links
 
 

1

Episodes Reimagined
Lists of American science fiction television series episodes